Santa Maria Goretti is a neighbourhood (bairro) in the city of Porto Alegre, the state capital of Rio Grande do Sul, in Brazil. It was created by Law 2688 from December 25, 1963.

Neighbourhoods in Porto Alegre